Boston City Council elections were held on November 4, 2003. Nine seats (five representatives and four at-large members) were contested in the general election, as the incumbents for districts 2, 3, 5, and 7 ran unopposed. Six seats (the four at-large positions, plus districts 4 and 6) had also been contested in the preliminary election held on September 23, 2003.

At-large
Councillors Michael F. Flaherty, Felix D. Arroyo, Maura Hennigan, and Stephen J. Murphy were re-elected. Patricia H. White, daughter of former Mayor of Boston Kevin White, was an unsuccessful candidate in this election.

District 1
Councillor Paul Scapicchio was re-elected.

District 2
Councillor James M. Kelly ran unopposed and was re-elected.

District 3
Councillor Maureen Feeney ran unopposed and was re-elected.

District 4
Councillor Charles Yancey was re-elected.

District 5
Councillor Robert Consalvo ran unopposed and was re-elected.

District 6
Councillor John M. Tobin Jr. was re-elected.

District 7
Councillor Chuck Turner ran unopposed and was re-elected.

District 8
Councillor Michael P. Ross was re-elected.

District 9
Councillor Jerry P. McDermott was re-elected.

See also
 List of members of Boston City Council

References

Further reading
 
 

City Council election
Boston City Council elections
Boston City Council election
Boston City Council